Jared Michael Cohn (also credited as Jared Michaels) is an American film director, screenwriter and actor. He has directed films such as Buddy Hutchins, Atlantic Rim, and Born Bad, among others, and has directed multiple films for The Asylum.

Background
Cohn is a writer, director, producer and actor born in New York, and graduated from the New York Institute of Technology with a Bachelor of Fine Arts degree in communication arts. His major was film production and post production. He is a photographer, editor and After Effects user, as well as a black belt in Shaolin Kempo Karate, a professional paintball player, and a certified scuba diver.  He and his body of work have received media coverage. He currently lives in Los Angeles, California.

Career
In 2011, Cohn wrote and directed Lifetime Channel's number one summer hit, Born Bad, a psychological thriller starring Meredith Monroe (Dawson’s Creek, Criminal Minds) and Michael Welch (the Twilight saga). In 2012, he premiered his first theatrical release, Hold Your Breath, which he directed. The same year he wrote and directed Bikini Spring Break, starring Robert Carradine (Revenge of the Nerds) and the horror-thriller 12/12/12.

In 2013, Cohn directed From the Sea (released as Atlantic Rim), starring Graham Greene (Dances with Wolves, Defiance) and David Chokachi (Witchblade, Baywatch). He also wrote and directed the women-in-prison drama Jailbait, and had a featured role in the independent horror-thriller, Feed the Devil which was shot on 35mm film.

Filmography

Actor

 Diary of an Affair (1 episode, 2004) as Andrew
 Legion of the Dead (2005) as Petrie
 Alien Abduction (2005) as Private Smalls
 Way of the Vampire (2005) as Roman
 Halloween Night (2006) as Daryll (as Jared Michaels)
 Sea Me (2006) as Shawn (as Jared Michaels)
 Blood Predator (2007) as Zak
 The Third Summer (2007) as Bags
 Teary Sockets (2008) as Bobby Tear
 Plaguers (2008) as Riley (as Jared Michaels)
 Real Fear (2008) as Johnathan (as Jared Michaels)
 Tyler's Ride (5 episodes, 2008) as Vinnie (as Jared Michaels)
 The Carpenter: Part 1 – And So They Die (2009) as Ted (as Jared Michaels)
 Legend Has It (2009) as Ollie (as Jared Michaels)
 Meaner Than Hell (2009) as Jakob 'Picaro Gonnoff' Baumberger (as Jared Michaels)
 Revenants (2010) as Danny (as Jared Michaels)
 Born Bad (2011) as Jaret
 Underground Lizard People (2011) as Chip
 Incident at Barstow (2011) as Griff (as Jared Michaels)
 12/12/12 (2012) as Jared
 MoreHorror in Hollywood (1 episode, 2012) as Himself 
 13/13/13 (2013) as Alex
 Asabiyyah: A New Social Cohesion (2013) as Star
 Atlantic Rim (2013) as Spitfire 
 EOTM Awards 2013 (2013) as Himself
 The Coed and the Zombie Stoner (2014) as Stoned Zombie
 P-51 Dragon Fighter (2014) as Lt. Gilman
 Feed the Devil (2014) as Marcus
 Pernicious (2015) as Shane
 Hulk Blood Tapes (2015) as Himself
 Wishing for a Dream (2015) as Louis Digman
 Minutes to Midnight (2015) as Richie

Director

 The Carpenter: Part 1 – And So They Die (2009) (and as screenwriter) (as Jared Michaels) 
 Born Bad (2011) (and as writer)  
 Underground Lizard People (2011)
 Bikini Spring Break (2012) (and as writer)  
 Hold Your Breath (2012)
 12/12/12 (2012)
 Atlantic Rim (2013)
 Jailbait (2014) (and as writer) 
 Bound (2015)
 Buddy Hutchins (2015) 
 Hulk Blood Tapes (2015)
 School's Out (2015)
 Little Dead Rotting Hood (2016)
 Wishing for a Dream (2016)
 The Horde (2016) 
 Halloween Pussy Trap Kill! Kill! (2017)
 Devil's Revenge (2019)
 Street Survivors: The True Story of the Lynyrd Skynyrd Plane Crash (2020) (and as writer)
 In the Drift (2020)
 Deadlock (2021)
 Vendetta (2022)

Producer

 Legend Has It (2009) (as Jared Michaels) 
 Revenants (2010) (as Jared Michaels)
 Night of the Dead (2012) 
 Hulk Blood Tapes'' (2015)

Reception
Cohn's films are typically released direct-to-video, via outlets such as Redbox, basic cable channels or supermarkets.

References

External links
 
 
 

Living people
Film producers from California
Screenwriters from New York (state)
American male television actors
Male actors from New York City
American male film actors
21st-century American male actors
Film directors from Los Angeles
Film producers from New York (state)
Screenwriters from California
Year of birth missing (living people)